Palestine Cellular Communications Company, trading as Jawwal, is the first Palestinian communications company specialized in cellular and wireless communications; assumes its business in the West Bank and Gaza Strip and is one of Paltel Group.

History
Jawwal was established in 1999, and obtained the first mobile license in the Palestinian Authority Territories selecting the most used system in the world (GSM) as being in line with the accelerated technological developments in the field of communications.

Jawwal commercial launching in Gaza was on August 15, 1999, and in the West Bank was on October 2, 1999.

In October 2001, Jawwal had suffered from holding its equipment by the Israeli authorities for the purpose of hindering its growth and limiting its network, for about two years the Company was unable to sell new lines or expand its customer base in order to maintain the level of its services commensurate with its network capacity.

In 2005, Jawwal had created a new method to overcome this barrier by adopting communication switchboards in London by which It became the first cellular communication company in the world that serves its subscribers across switchboards thousands of miles away from its headquarters. Later in 2005, Jawwal obtained ISO 14001 Certificate for Environmental Management System (EMS).

By the end of 2007, Jawwal had transcended 1 Million subscribers, while during April 2010 the Company had transcended 2 Million Subscribers.

In 2012 Jawwal has succeeded in the Palestinian market by reaching more than 2.45 million subscribers.

In 2017, Jawwal contracted with ERICSSON to import the main devices and equipment to start providing 3G services to its subscribers. By the end of 2017 the total number of its subscribers reached 2.9 Million subscribers and reached 3 million subscribers by the first quarter of 2018, where Jawwal’s market share of the Palestinian cellular market is 75% of the Palestinian market.

Jawwal serves its subscribers through 26 showrooms, more than 400 exclusive dealers and Thousands of point of sale and offers international roaming services with more than 436 operators in over 170 countries and has coverage up to 98% of the West Bank and Gaza Strip.

Network

Jawwal has struggled with the limited frequency allocated to Jawwal by the Israeli authorities. Jawwal started offering 3G services commercially on 23 January 2018. Network speeds 4G LTE are not available.

References 

Telecommunications companies of the State of Palestine
Companies established in 1999
Palestinian brands
Mobile phone companies of the State of Palestine
1999 establishments in the Palestinian territories